Second Government under Vojislav Koštunica as the Prime Minister was formed on 15 May 2007. After Serbian parliamentary election, 2008 this cabinet served as a transitional government handling only technical issues until the new government was formed on 7 July 2008.

The Government of Serbia was formed on 15 May 2007 after three-month-long negotiations and fierce political scandals and fighting that much disturbed the population, and exactly seven minutes before midnight when the three-month constitutional deadline would pass. It is formed by the Democratic Party (including the minority Sanjak Democratic Party), the coalition of the Democratic Party of Serbia and New Serbia, and G17 Plus. The DS, DSS-NS and G17+ parliamentary clubs elected the new cabinet proposed by Vojislav Koštunica (DSS), the previous Prime Minister, with the further support of some of the minorities (List for Sanjak and Roma Union of Serbia) votes accumulating 133 of the parliament's 250 seats. The Cabinet was sworn shortly before midnight, the deadline, in front of Milutin Mrkonjić (SPS), the temporary acting Speaker. The five new Ministers (Dragan Šutanovac, Božidar Đelić, Milan Marković, Mlađan Dinkić and Dušan Petrović) that were Deputies in the parliament have immediately filed their resignations, as per the Constitution which disables a Minister to be an active member in the National Assembly.

The Government collapsed on 8 March 2008. New parliamentary elections were held together with local elections on 11 May 2008. The new Government was formed on 7 July 2008.

Composition

See also
Cabinet of Serbia (2000–01)
Cabinet of Serbia (2001–04)
Cabinet of Serbia (2004–07)
Cabinet of Serbia (2008–12)
Cabinet of Serbia (2012–14)
Politics of Serbia

References

External links
The Government of Serbia 

Government of Serbia (2007-2008)
2007 establishments in Serbia
2008 disestablishments in Serbia
Cabinets established in 2007
Cabinets disestablished in 2008